The Most Outstanding Lineman Award was an award annually given to the best defensive player or offensive lineman in the Canadian Football League from the year 1955 to 1973.  By the 1974 season, the league decided to make two separate awards for both defensive players and offensive linemen.

CFL's Most Outstanding Lineman Award winners (1955-1973)

1973 - Ray Nettles (LB), British Columbia Lions
1972 - John Helton (DT), Calgary Stampeders
1971 - Wayne Harris (LB), Calgary Stampeders
1970 - Wayne Harris (LB), Calgary Stampeders
1969 - John LaGrone (DT), Edmonton Eskimos
1968 - Ken Lehmann (LB), Ottawa Rough Riders
1967 - Ed McQuarters (DT), Saskatchewan Roughriders
1966 - Wayne Harris (LB), Calgary Stampeders
1965 - Wayne Harris (LB), Calgary Stampeders
1964 - Tom Brown (LB), British Columbia Lions

1963 - Tom Brown (LB), British Columbia Lions
1962 - John Barrow (DT), Hamilton Tiger-Cats
1961 - Frank Rigney (OT), Winnipeg Blue Bombers
1960 - Herb Gray (DE), Winnipeg Blue Bombers
1959 - Roger Nelson (OT), Edmonton Eskimos
1958 - Don Luzzi (DT), Calgary Stampeders
1957 - Kaye Vaughan (OT), Ottawa Rough Riders
1956 - Kaye Vaughan (OT), Ottawa Rough Riders
1955 - Tex Coulter (OL), Montreal Alouettes

CFL's Most Outstanding Lineman Award - Runners Up (1955-1973)
Note: Prior to 1973 the runner up for this award was not the DeMarco–Becket Memorial Trophy or Leo Dandurand Trophy winners. Finalists were first announced in 1957.

 1973 – Ed George (OT), Montreal Alouettes
 1972 – Jim Stillwagon (DT), Toronto Argonauts
 1971 – Mark Kosmos (LB), Montreal Alouettes
 1970 – Angelo Mosca (DT), Hamilton Tiger-Cats
 1969 – Billy Joe Booth (DE), Ottawa Rough Riders
 1968 – Ted Urness (C), Saskatchewan Roughriders
 1967 – John Barrow (DT), Hamilton Tiger-Cats
 1966 – Wayne Harris (LB), Calgary Stampeders
 1965 – John Barrow (DT), Hamilton Tiger-Cats

 1964 – John Barrow (DT), Hamilton Tiger-Cats
 1963 – Angelo Mosca (DT), Hamilton Tiger-Cats
 1962 – Wayne Harris (LB), Calgary Stampeders
 1961 – John Barrow (DT), Hamilton Tiger-Cats
 1960 – Kaye Vaughan (OT), Ottawa Rough Riders
 1959 – John Barrow (DT), Hamilton Tiger-Cats
 1958 – Jackie Simpson (LB), Montreal Alouettes
 1957 – Art Walker (OT/DG), Edmonton Eskimos
 1956 - Buddy Alliston (LB/OG), Winnipeg Blue Bombers

 1955 - Vince Scott, Hamilton; Martin Ruby, Saskatchewan; Dale Meinert, Edmonton

See also
CFL's Most Outstanding Defensive Player Award
CFL's Most Outstanding Offensive Lineman Award

References
CFL Publications: 2011 Facts, Figures & Records

Defunct Canadian Football League trophies and awards